The Nurse is a 1912 American dramatic short film starring Mary Miles Minter. It is approximately 11 minutes long. This is Minter's first screen appearance, and the only one of her films where she is billed as Juliet Shelby, the stage name by which she was known from appearing in "The Littlest Rebel." As with many of Minter's features, it is believed to be a lost film.

Plot
As described in The Moving Picture World:

Cast (incomplete)
 Mary Miles Minter as the daughter (billed as Juliet Shelby)
 Ethel Elder as the mother

References

External links
 

1912 films
1912 drama films
Silent American drama films
American silent short films
American black-and-white films
1912 short films
1910s English-language films
1910s American films